John Appleton (February 11, 1815 – August 22, 1864) was an American lawyer, politician and diplomat who served as the  United States' first chargé d'affaires to Bolivia, and later as special envoy to Great Britain and Russia. Born in Beverly, Massachusetts, Appleton graduated from Bowdoin College in 1834 and attended Harvard Law School from 1835 to 1836. On leaving Harvard, he became a barrister and newspaper editor while maintaining a vigorous involvement in Democratic politics. In 1840 he was appointed as registrar of probates for Cumberland County, Maine, and in 1845 became Chief Clerk for the United States Department of the Navy.

In January 1848 Appleton was promoted to Chief Clerk of the State Department, but resigned in March when he was named as the United States' first chargé d'affaires to Bolivia. The posting was unsuccessful, and Appleton resigned after six months service and returned to the United States to pursue his personal political interests. In 1851 he was narrowly elected to Congress, representing Maine's 2nd congressional district. As a Congressman he became noted for his oratorical skills, and was selected to give the obituary address for former Senator and Secretary of State Daniel Webster in 1852.

In 1855 Appleton was sent as diplomatic envoy to London, England to promote United States interests in negotiations to end the Crimean War. He returned to the United States in 1857 and was appointed as the fourth Assistant Secretary of State, a post he held for the following three years. As Assistant Secretary he opened discussions with Russia regarding a prospective Alaska Purchase, leading to the United States acquiring that territory in 1867. Concurrently, he was editor of a pro-Democratic newspaper The Washington Union, but his career was marred by allegations that he misused this position for personal gain. He was the United States' envoy to Russia from 1860 until his retirement in 1861. Appleton died on August 22, 1864, and is buried in Portland's Evergreen Cemetery.

Early life: 1815–44 
John Appleton was born in Beverly, Massachusetts on February 11, 1815. His father, John White Appleton (1780–1862), was a resident of Portland, Maine; his mother, Sophia Appleton (nee Williams) (1786–1860) was from Connecticut. Appleton was the third child of nine of his parents and spent most of his childhood in Portland.

Appleton studied law at Bowdoin College in the 1830s, graduating as a Legum Doctor in 1834 and pursuing further studies at Harvard Law School in the summers of 1835 and 1836. Throughout the 1830s he worked in New England legal firms. On 20 June 1837 he passed his bar examination in Cumberland County, Maine and subsequently opened his own legal practice in Portland. In 1838 Appleton was appointed as lead editor of the Eastern Argus, a now-defunct newspaper serving the Portland area, and in 1840 and from 1842 to 1844 he served as registrar of probates for Cumberland County.  He married Susan Lovering Dodge in 1840, and their only child, Eben Dodge Appleton, was born in Portland in 1843.

Political career: 1845–64

Chief Clerk 

In addition to his legal practice, Appleton's abiding interest was in Democratic Party politics. In the 1840s he became associated with Tennessee Governor James K. Polk, who would be elected President in a close-fought race in 1844. Following Polk's inauguration, Appleton accepted an offer from United States Navy Secretary George Bancroft to join the administration as the Navy's Chief Clerk. His closeness to Polk continued while in this role, culminating in an invitation to act as the President's personal diarist for a goodwill tour of the northeastern states. Appleton's record of this visit was later published as a 135-page volume entitled North for Union. The book includes Appleton's endorsement of northeastern arts and industry, alongside a studied disapproval of its urban culture. Boston is described as having a "greatness" bestowed by its role in the American Revolutionary War, which permitted Appleton to "almost forget its meanness" today. Industrialized Lowell is criticized for commercialism, as "not in such places are republican spirits and Spartan hearts best educated." Describing the region's largest city, Appleton wrote:

New York ... has the social faults which belong to an eminently business place, and to a shifting, moneymaking people. Everything there is confused, and every man there is busily pursuing some selfish aim. One who walks slowly in the streets is in danger of being run over, and everybody is so much in a hurry there that, in such a case, no resident would probably stop to pick him up.

On January 26, 1848 Appleton was promoted to the role of Chief Clerk for the Department of State. In this position, Appleton was the second-ranking officer of the Department.

Chargé d'affaires to Bolivia 
On March 30, 1848, then-Secretary of State James Buchanan appointed Appleton as United States chargé d'affaires to Bolivia, which had recently declared independence from Peru. His primary instructions were to open economic relations with Bolivia, assure them of United States' goodwill and help secure a cross-border treaty that would transfer the port of Arica from Peruvian to Bolivian control. Buchanan further urged Appleton to use his influence as chargé d'affaires to encourage Bolivia towards democracy, by "presenting to them the example of our own country, where all controversies are decided at the ballot box."

Appleton set out for his Bolivian post in the summer of 1848. However his arrival was delayed first by the shipwreck of the USS Onkahye, which had been carrying him to South America, and then by slow progress through the Andes Mountains en route to La Paz. In October he reached the Bolivian capital to discover that the government of President José Miguel de Velasco Franco was besieged by soldiers under the command of former Minister for War Manuel Isidoro Belzu. Both de Velasco and Belzu claimed to be head of state, but neither would receive Appleton in order that he might present his diplomatic credentials and assume office. Belzu's forces seized national control eight weeks later, and  Appleton was able to take up his position as chargé in December.

Having finally taken office, Appleton found his posting a challenging one. In correspondence with the United States Government he noted that the country seemed to have a difficult climate, few North Americans and no roads. Attempts to deliver on Buchanan's instructions for a cross-border treaty with Peru were also rebuffed, as the Peruvian Government had not been advised that Appleton would be undertaking this task and declined to negotiate with him. Discontented and in poor health, Appleton requested that he be recalled to the United States. He resigned on May 4, 1849, less than six months after assuming his post.

Election to Congress 

Appleton returned to Maine in late 1849 and resumed his interests in a political career. On March 4, 1851, he was elected to the 32nd United States Congress as the Democratic candidate in Maine's 2nd congressional district, defeating Whig candidate William Ferguson by 40 votes.

Despite the failures of his Bolivian post, Appleton continued his interest in international relations by taking up a position on the House Committee on Foreign Affairs. His focus was now on European affairs, taking a conservative line against international republicanism and political reform which he felt was motivated by emotion rather than reason. For Appleton, European republican sentiment was "like the fabled Phaeton, [who] seizes the reins with passion, drives madly off the course, and nearly engulfs the world in darkness." The new Congressman also demonstrated a talent for oratory, delivering a series of speeches noted for their graceful, impressive delivery. His speaking skills were recognized in December 1852 when he was chosen by Congress to read the obituary address for former Senator and Secretary of State Daniel Webster.

Envoy to London 
Appleton declined to run for re-election to Congress in 1852. Instead he returned to Maine, and in February 1855 was appointed as diplomatic envoy to London, England, with instructions to lead United States engagement in negotiations to end the Crimean War. The principal United States interest was to prevent the Crimean peace negotiations from also encompassing a prohibition on privateering in international waters. Despite repeated efforts, Appleton was unsuccessful in advancing this case, and privateering was duly prohibited in the Declaration of Paris in 1856. Appleton did not remain in Europe to see the Declaration signed, resigning his post on November 16, 1855. A State Department offer to remain in London as United States chargé d'affaires was also declined and Appleton.returned to the United States in December, immediately throwing himself into James Buchanan's 1856 Presidential campaign.

Assistant Secretary of State, Envoy to Russia 

After Buchanan's inauguration in 1857, Appleton was nominated by Edmund Burke to run a pro-Buchanan newspaper, the Washington Union. After a few months, Appleton resigned due to ill health. On April 4, 1857 he was nominated as United States Assistant Secretary of State. Appleton superseded the Chief Clerk as the second-ranking officer of the Department. In 1858, Appleton was charged with corruption from his involvement in the "public printing plunder", in which he used his influence and his position as editor to make around $10,000 ($ in ). Appleton did not deny the charges.

While in office he was involved in preliminary discussions with Tsarist Russia over the prospective Alaska Purchase. Talks were held in Washington between Appleton, Russian representative Eduard de Stoeckl and chairman of the U.S. Senate Committee on Naval Affairs William M. Gwin. Appleton and Gwin offered $5 million ($ in ) in 1859, but de Stoeck wanted more money. No decision had been made before the 1860 Presidential election, and discussion was then indefinitely postponed upon the outbreak of the American Civil War.

Appleton resigned as Assistant Secretary of State on June 10, 1860. On September 9 he was appointed as diplomatic envoy to Russia. Appleton showed impatience with the rise of Congress Poland. When he commented back to the United States, not much was done, since the rise of the Confederate States. During meetings with Prince Gortchacow in April 1861, Appleton and Gortchacow concluded Russia would not recognize the Confederacy, however, trade between the two would still remain. Appleton retired for health reasons on June 8, 1861.

Death 
Appleton died on August 22, 1864. He is buried in Portland's Evergreen Cemetery.

Notes

References

External links 
 
 

 
 
 

 
 

1815 births
1864 deaths
Appleton family
United States Assistant Secretaries of State
Bowdoin College alumni
Ambassadors of the United States to Bolivia
Ambassadors of the United States to Russia
Politicians from Portland, Maine
Maine lawyers
People from Beverly, Massachusetts
Burials at Evergreen Cemetery (Portland, Maine)
19th-century American diplomats
Democratic Party members of the United States House of Representatives from Maine
19th-century American politicians
Chief Clerks of the United States Department of State
19th-century American lawyers